Dennis Davis (1949–2016) was an American musician.

Dennis Davis may also refer to:

Dennis Davis (climber) (1927–2015), British mountaineer
Dennis Davis (politician) (born 1941), American politician